"Masterpiece" is a song by American metalcore band Motionless in White. Written by vocalist Chris "Motionless" Cerulli, Justin deBlieck, Drew Fulk, Steve Sopchak, and Erik Ron, it was produced by Drew Fulk and Justin deBlieck and featured on the band's 2022 sixth studio album Scoring the End of the World. The song was also released as the second single from the album on April 14, 2022. The single became the band's first song to reach number one on the Billboard Mainstream Rock Airplay chart.

Promotion and release
The song was released on April 14, 2022 as the second single from Motionless in White's sixth studio album Scoring the End of the World. The band released a reimagined version of the song on August 26, 2022 called "Masterpiece: Motion Picture Collection".

Composition and lyrics
"Masterpiece" was written by Chris "Motionless" Cerulli, Justin deBlieck, Drew Fulk, Steve Sopchak, and Erik Ron and composed by the band. The song has been described as a "heavy ballad". In a press release, Cerulli said:

Music video
The music video for "Masterpiece" was released on the same day as the single was streamed. Directed by Max Moore, the video show the band in an abandoned home, sifting through tokens of a lost past until a cathartic blaze burns it all down.

Personnel
 Chris "Motionless" Cerulli – lead vocals, songwriter
 Ryan Sitkowski – lead guitar
 Ricky "Horror" Olson – rhythm guitar, backing vocals
 Justin Morrow – bass, backing vocals
 Vinny Mauro – drums, percussion

Charts

Weekly charts

Year-end charts

See also
 List of Billboard Mainstream Rock number-one songs of the 2020s

References

2022 singles
2022 songs
Motionless in White songs
Songs written by Erik Ron
Roadrunner Records singles